WMXI (98.1 FM, "News Radio 98.1") is a news/talk formatted radio station licensed to Ellisville, Mississippi, serving the Laurel-Hattiesburg Arbitron market.

History
WMXI started as an alternative rock formatted radio station as "98X". Sometime down the road, the station changed format and name to a Top 40 formatted radio station as "98.1 Hot FM" before its current talk format.

External links

MXI
News and talk radio stations in the United States
Radio stations established in 1997